KINI (96.1 FM) is a radio station broadcasting a CHR music format. Licensed to Crookston, Nebraska, United States, the station is currently owned by Rosebud Sioux Tribe and features programming from AP Radio and Premiere Networks.

References

External links
KINI Hits 96 Facebook
 
 

INI